Gianfranco Ghirlanda  (born 5 July 1942) is an Italian Roman Catholic priest whose career has been closely associated with the Pontifical Gregorian University where he has taught since 1975, served as dean of the Faculty of Canon Law from 1995 to 2004, and led as rector from 2004 to 2010.

Pope Francis made him a cardinal on 27 August 2022.

Biography
Gianfranco Ghirlanda was born on 5 July 1942 in Rome. He worked at Fiat while studying at the Sapienza University of Rome and earned a doctorate in jurisprudence there in 1966. He joined the Society of Jesus that same year and completed his studies of theology at the Pontifical Gregorian University, earning a bachelor's degree in sacred theology in 1973. He was ordained a priest in 1973. Continuing to study at the Gregorian, he earned a licentiate in canon law in 1975 and a doctorate in canon law summa cum laude in 1978.

Ghirlanda has taught courses in canon law in various faculties of the Gregorian since 1975. In 1986 he became a full professor and served as dean of the Faculty of Canon Law from 1995 to 2004. He has served the Holy See as a consultor of various congregations and councils, and was a judge of the Court of Appeal in Vatican City from 1993 to 2003. He has published books on canon law, and approximately 110 articles in various publications.

He was appointed rector of the Gregorian on 1 September 2004 by Pope John Paul II.

He has assisted in the drafting of apostolic constitutions and authored the commentary that accompanied the release of  Anglicanorum coetibus in 2009.

On 4 July 2014, Cardinal Joao Braz de Aviz and Archbishop Jose Rodriguez Carballo, the Prefect and the Secretary of the Congregation for Institutes of Consecrated Life and Societies of Apostolic Life, announced Ghirlanda's appointment as papal assistant to the Legion of Christ in its ongoing attempt to complete its renewal process. He was assigned a similar role in 2020 with respect to the lay association .

On 6 October 2018, he was named a member of the Dicastery for the Laity, Family and Life.

On 27 August 2022, Pope Francis made him a cardinal deacon, assigning him as his deaconry the Church of the Gesù. He received a dispensation from the requirement that only bishops can become cardinals.

See also
 Cardinals created by Pope Francis

References

External links
 

1942 births
Living people
20th-century Italian Jesuits
Pontifical Gregorian University rectors
Sapienza University of Rome alumni
21st-century Italian Jesuits
21st-century Italian cardinals
Jesuit cardinals
Cardinals created by Pope Francis